Gunja(Urdu: گنجه ) is a town and a union council of Kharian Tehsil and Gujrat District, in the Punjab province of Pakistan. It is part of Kharian Tehsil.  Other villages in the union council are Chak Ikhlas, Mughli, Dhalla, Chak Rajjadi, Jataria Khurd, Jataria Kalan, Chatta and Shahsar mast.

Geography
The nearest city of Gunja is Lalamusa. Gunja is a midpoint between three cities Dinga, Kharian and Lalamusa. Almost 11 km from Lalamusa and 15 km from Kharian and Dinga. Surrounding villages of Gunja is Hail, Bashna, Chak Iklas and Mughli wali. Gunja is 8 km far from G.T Road.

Village Gunja also have a Govt Hospital

And Private clinics around the village

Lifestyle
The village is surrounded on all sides by farmland.  The major trades in the town are farming, masonry, and other types of manual labor.  Gunja has a large diaspora living overseas, mainly in Middle east, United States, and Europe.  Remittances sent from overseas are a major source of income of the village.

Schools
Gunja has a number of private and government schools including:

Government boys High School
Government girls High School
Moazam Ideal Public School
Tipu Junior Model School
The laurel house School
Al-Qalam Public School

Notable people
 Sultan M. Babar is a member of the board of health and the head of its medical department in Carteret, NJ  He is also a delegate to the 2012 Democratic National Convention

References

Union councils of Gujrat District
Populated places in Gujrat District